Michael Benjamin may refer to:

 Mike Benjamin (baseball) (born 1965), former infielder in Major League Baseball 
 Michael Benjamin (politician) (born 1958), Democrat member of the New York Assembly
 Michael Benjamin (investor) (born 1969), private investor, Republican candidate for U.S. Senate in 2004
 Michael Benjamin (musician) (1981–2022), Haitian singer, songwriter and producer